Andrew Small (born 9 July 1974) is a professional rugby union referee who represents the English Rugby Union.

Rugby union career

Playing career

Amateur career

Small played for the Ashburton clubs Tinwald RFC and Collegiate RFC.

Referee career

Professional career

Small joined the Otago Referees Association in 1993.
He moved to England in 2002.
He made his English Premiership debut in 2006.
He refereed the very first 1872 Cup match on 28 December 2007.

References

Living people
New Zealand rugby union referees
Rugby union officials
1974 births
1872 Cup referees
Premiership Rugby referees